Englefield is a village and civil parish in the English county of Berkshire. The village is mostly within the bounds of the private walled estate of Englefield House. The village is in the district of West Berkshire, close to Reading.

Toponymy
The place-name 'Englefield' is first attested in the Anglo Saxon Chronicle for 871, where it appears as Engla feld. It appears as Englefel in the Domesday Book of 1086, and as Englefeld in the Feet of Fines for 1196. The name indicates settlement by the Angles in Saxon territory.

Battle of Englefield

In 870, the village was the site of the Battle of Englefield. This was fought between the Anglo-Saxons, under Æthelwulf, Ealdorman of Berkshire, and the Danes, and resulted in a resounding victory for the Saxons. The battle was the first of a series in the winter of 870–1. The village may have been named after the battle, Englefield meaning "English field".

Englefield House

Englefield House was the home of the Englefield family, supposedly from the time of King Edgar and certainly until the Elizabethan era when the present building was erected. The house eventually passed to the Benyon family, as part of the largest privately owned estate in West Berkshire.

Village
In the late 19th century, Richard Fellowes Benyon rebuilt the villagers' houses as a model estate village and provided them with such amenities as a swimming pool, soup kitchen and a new school. The village relies on and contributes to the amenities and organisations in Theale and Tilehurst as well as Reading which bound it to the south and east.

Demography

References

External links 

 St Mark's Englefield
 Englefield Social Club
 Englefield Village Hall

 
Villages in Berkshire
Civil parishes in Berkshire
West Berkshire District